Arif Hasan, is a Pakistani architect, planner, activist, social researcher, and writer. He is a recipient of Hilal-i-Imtiaz, the country's highest award for its citizens.

Early life and education
Born in 1943, Arif Hasan migrated with his parents to Karachi in 1947. Hasan studied architecture at Oxford Polytechnic (now Oxford Brookes University), UK from 1960 to 1965.

He received his school and college education in Karachi; studied architecture at the Oxford Polytechnic, UK from 1960–1965; worked in architects' offices in the UK, France and Spain for three years, and returned to Karachi in 1968 to establish his independent practice. This practice slowly evolved into dealing with national and International urban planning and development issues.

Career

Architecture
In 1968, he started his own practice in Karachi.

Current selected involvements
 Architect and planning consultant in private practice  
 Documenting Karachi's history and development issues and the process of social change in Pakistan    
 Visiting professor, Department of Architecture and Planning, NED University, Karachi  
 Chairperson, Orangi Pilot Project-Research & Training Institute, Karachi  
 Chairperson, Urban Resource Centre, Karachi  
 Member of the Executive Council of the Asian Coalition for Housing Rights, Bangkok  
 Chancellor, Textile Institute of Pakistan, Karachi  
 Member of the Advisory Board of "Environment & Urbanization", the journal of the International Institute for Environment and Development, UK
 Member, Editorial Board of "International Development Planning Review", Liverpool University, UK  
 Member, Board of Studies for  
Architecture at the NED University, Karachi  
Karachi University Visual Arts Department  
The Department of Architecture and Planning, Dawood College, Karachi  
 Member, UN's Advisory Group on Forced Evictions  
 Member, Sindh Cultural Heritage Technical and Advisory Committees of the Culture Department of the Sindh Government  
 Member, Governing Body of the Karachi Public Transport Society

Activism
He has been involved with the Orangi Pilot Project (OPP), Karachi since 1982. In 1989, he founded the Urban Resource Centre (URC) in Karachi of which he is a founder and chairman.

Some previous involvements
 As Consultant in the 1970s to the Appropriate Technology Development Organisation (ATDO) of the Government of Pakistan, developed models for sanitation, housing and the conceptual framework for research on low cost building materials and environmental issues  
 As Principal Consultant of the Orangi Pilot Project (1981–2000), applied and modified the models developed for the ATDO to the self-help philosophy of Akhtar Hameed Khan, documented them and their social and physical impacts and promoted their expansion in different areas of Pakistan and abroad  
 Promoted the ATDO/OPP concepts with modifications for different urban and rural contexts as consultant and advisor to different multilateral and bilateral development agencies, government institutions and policy issues, national and international NGOs, and the Aga Khan Network. This led to the establishment of a number of development organisations such as Thardeep  
 Was a member of the Governing Boards of the International Institute for Environment and Development, UK; Karachi Water & Sewerage Board; Karachi Development Authority; National Fund for Mohenjodaro; Pakistan Institute of International Affairs, Karachi; Pakistan Institute of Labour Education and Research, Karachi; Karachi Metropolitan Transport Authority; Pakistan Poverty Alleviation Fund; Thardeep Rural Development Project  
 Member of the United Nation's Millennium Development Goal's Task Force 8 (2003–2004); Drafting Committee of the National Housing Policy of the Government of Pakistan (1989); Government's 2007 Task Force on Pakistan Vision 2030.  
 Member of the External Review Committee for the Aga Khan Programme for Islamic Architecture at MIT and Harvard; Senior Fellow of the Pakistan Institute of Development Economics; and chairperson of the Federal Government's Task Force on Urbanization; and Member, Academic Committee and of the Architecture Board of Studies at the Indus Valley School of Art and Architecture, Karachi

Works

Important architectural works
 Hasan Square, Karachi, August 1972
 SOS Children’s Village, Karachi, May 1985
 Orangi Pilot Project-Research and Training Institute Building, 1986
 Pakistan Institute of Labor Education and Research Complex, Karachi, 2000
 Nagarparkar Guest House Complex, 2009
 Sind Rural Support Organisation, Head Office & Hostel, Sukkur, September 2009
 Crescent Model School, Lahore, 1966
 Sind Zamindar Hotel conservation, Karachi, 2004

Important social projects
 OPP-RTI – Sanitation and Housing Programmes
 Thardeep Rural Development Project
 Nagarparkar Tallukka Planning Project
 Kareemabad Planning Support Services
 Urban Resource Center (URC)

Awards
 1983: Best Building Award, Karachi Development Authority (KDA)
 1990: International Year for the Shelterless Memorial Award, Japan
 2000: Prince Claus Award: Urban Heroes, Netherlands
 2000: World Habitat Award of the British Housing Foundation (conferred on the Orangi Pilot Project-Research & Training Institute)
 2001: Hilal-i-Imtiaz
 2003: Life Time Achievement Award, Institute of Architects, Pakistan

Honours
 1987: Celebrity speaker at the 16th Union of International Architects Congress in Brighton, UK
 1990 – 1996: Member of the Steering Committee of the Aga Khan Award for Architecture
 1995 – 1998: Master Jury member for the Aga Khan Award for Architecture, Geneva
 2007: Member, INTBAU (International Network for Traditional Building, Architecture and Urbanism), India Committee of Honour

Writings

Articles
Arif Hasan's complete works (articles, reports, papers) are available for download at http://arifhasan.org/category/articles

 Resilience, Sustainability and Development:some as yet undefined issues Woodrow Wilson Conference on Community Resilience, 2008

Books
 Participatory Development, Karachi: Oxford University Press.
 "Understanding Karachi: Planning and reform for the future", Karachi: City Press. 
 The Unplanned Revolution, Karachi: Oxford University Press.
 Planning and Development Options for Karachi, Islamabad: Shehersaaz
 The Scale and Causes of Urban Change in Pakistan, Karachi: Ushba Publishing International
 Hasan, Arif and Mansoor Raza, Hijrat Aur Pakistan Mein Chotey Shehr (Urdu), Karachi: Ushba Publishing International
 Hasan, Arif and Mansoor Raza, "Migration and Small Towns in Pakistan" (English), Karachi: Ushba Publishing International
 Hasan, Arif, Asiya Sadiq Polak and Christophe Polak, The Hawkers of Saddar Bazaar, Karachi: Ushba Publishing International
 Hasan, Arif and Mansoor Raza, "From Micro-finance to the Building of Local Institutions: The Evolution of Micro-credit Programme of the OPP's Orangi Charitable Trust, Karachi, Pakistan", Karachi: Oxford University Press

References

External links
 Six new book by Arif Hasan and Colleagues Retrieved 29 January 2011.
 Arif Hasan Research and Development from Pakistan Retrieved November 2012.

Living people
Pakistani architects
21st-century Pakistani architects
Pakistani architecture writers
Pakistani architectural historians
Pakistani urban planners
Recipients of Hilal-i-Imtiaz
Architects from Karachi
Writers from Karachi
Muhajir people
Year of birth missing (living people)
New Classical architects